William Thurlow Weed Brotherton Jr. (April 17, 1926 – April 6, 1997) was the Democratic President of the West Virginia Senate from Kanawha County and served from 1973 to 1981. He was a Justice of the West Virginia Supreme Court from 1984 until 1995, and served as chief justice in 1989 and 1994. Brotherton served a total of six terms in the West Virginia House of Delegates and five terms in the State Senate between 1952 and 1980.

Early life and education
William Thurlow Weed Brotherton Jr. was born in Charleston, West Virginia on April 17, 1926. During World War II era, Brotherton served in the United States Navy. He graduated from Washington and Lee University in 1947.

Notes

References

External links

1926 births
1997 deaths
American Episcopalians
Democratic Party members of the West Virginia House of Delegates
Politicians from Charleston, West Virginia
Presidents of the West Virginia State Senate
Democratic Party West Virginia state senators
Justices of the Supreme Court of Appeals of West Virginia
Washington and Lee University alumni
Washington and Lee University School of Law alumni
Lawyers from Charleston, West Virginia
Chief Justices of the Supreme Court of Appeals of West Virginia
United States Navy sailors
20th-century American politicians